The 2004 Marbella Football Cup was held in January 2004 in Marbella, Spain. Four teams participated in tournament: two from Germany and one each from China and The Netherlands. This tournament was a predecessor to the Marbella Cup tournament.

Teams
  Borussia Dortmund
  Borussia Mönchengladbach
  FC Volendam
  Shanghai Shenhua F.C.

Match

Winner

External links
Official site
RSSSF: Marbella Football Cup 2004

2004
2003–04 in German football
2003–04 in Belgian football
2004 in Chinese football